The stone flounder (Kareius bicoloratus) is a flatfish of the family Pleuronectidae. Its native habitat is the temperate waters of the northwest Pacific, from Japan to the Kuril islands, Sakhalin, Korea, northern China and Taiwan. It is oceanodromous and is found in salt, brackish and fresh waters.

Diet

The stone flounder's diet consists of zoobenthos organisms such as amphipods, bivalves, mysids and polychaetes.

References

stone flounder
Marine fauna of East Asia
stone flounder